Lillehammer Fotballklubb is a Norwegian football club from Lillehammer, currently playing in the 4. divisjon, the fifth tier of the Norwegian football league system. The club colors are white, and the home field is Stampesletta. Players who started their career there include David Hanssen Caleb Francis

History

Lillehammer FK was established in 1969 as a result of a merger of Lillehammer clubs SK Mesna and FK Fremad Lillehammer (founded 1911). The club played its first season, the 1969 season, in 4. divisjon. In the following 1970 season, danish full-time coach Frank Gaba was hired.

The club went through a period as Faaberg Fotball Lillehammer after a merger at the end of the season in 1999 between the senior team of Lillehammer FK and the football department of Faaberg IL; Faaberg Fotball. Ahead of the 2010 season the entire club Lillehammer FK incorporated the senior and junior team of FF Lillehammer, which thus ceased to exist, while Faaberg IL reverted to fielding its own team.

Lillehammer FK played in the 3. divisjon from the 2013 season, after a period in the 2. divisjon since the 2009 season, having avoided relegation after the 2010 season due to the bankruptcy of FC Lyn Oslo. In the 2017 season, Lillehammer relegated to the fifth tier and have played in 4. divisjon since then.

Recent history 
{|class="wikitable"
|-bgcolor="#efefef"
! Season
! 
! Pos.
! Pl.
! W
! D
! L
! GS
! GA
! P
!Cup
!Notes
|-
|2000–2009
|align=center colspan=11|Competed as Faaberg Fotball Lillehammer
|-
|2010
|2. divisjon
|align=right |12
|align=right|26||align=right|9||align=right|4||align=right|13
|align=right|45||align=right|53||align=right|31
||Second round
|Avoided relegation due to the bankruptcy of FC Lyn Oslo
|-
|2011
|2. divisjon
|align=right |9
|align=right|24||align=right|8||align=right|5||align=right|11
|align=right|39||align=right|56||align=right|29
||First round
|
|-
|2012 
|2. divisjon
|align=right bgcolor="#FFCCCC"| 13
|align=right|25||align=right|6||align=right|10||align=right|10
|align=right|42||align=right|54||align=right|28
||First round
|Relegated
|-
|2013 
|3. divisjon
|align=right|4
|align=right|26||align=right|16||align=right|4||align=right|6
|align=right|75||align=right|34||align=right|52
||Second qualifying round
|
|-
|2014 
|3. divisjon
|align=right|4
|align=right|26||align=right|14||align=right|5||align=right|7
|align=right|60||align=right|33||align=right|47
||Second qualifying round
|
|-
|2015 
|3. divisjon
|align=right|3
|align=right|26||align=right|14||align=right|6||align=right|6
|align=right|77||align=right|27||align=right|48
||First round
|
|-
|2016 
|3. divisjon
|align=right|3
|align=right|26||align=right|14||align=right|7||align=right|5
|align=right|54||align=right|26||align=right|49
||Second round
|
|-
|2017 
|3. divisjon
|align=right bgcolor="#FFCCCC"| 11
|align=right|26||align=right|8||align=right|5||align=right|13
|align=right|54||align=right|57||align=right|29
||First qualifying round
|Relegated
|-
|2018 
|4. divisjon
|align=right| 2
|align=right|22||align=right|18||align=right|0||align=right|4
|align=right|77||align=right|11||align=right|54
||First round
|
|}

References

External links
Official site

Football clubs in Norway
Association football clubs established in 1911
Sport in Lillehammer
1911 establishments in Norway